Matuu is growing municipality located in Machakos County, Yatta constituency. It is midway between Nairobi/ Kitui en route to Garissa.

Populated places in Kenya
Machakos County